The next Haryana Legislative Assembly election is scheduled to be held on or before October 2024 to elect all 90 members of the state's Legislative Assembly.

Background 
The tenure of Haryana Legislative Assembly is scheduled to be end on 3 November 2024. The previous Assembly elections were held in October 2019. After the election, a coalition of Bharatiya Janata Party and Jannayak Janta Party formed the state government, with Manohar Lal Khattar becoming the Chief Minister.

Schedule

Parties and Alliances









Others

See also 

 Politics of Haryana
 2024 elections in India

References

State Assembly elections in Haryana
Future elections in India